The Layover is a travel and food show on the Travel Channel hosted by Anthony Bourdain.  The show premiered on November 21, 2011 in an episode based on Singapore. The format and the content of the show are based on what a traveler can do, eat, visit and enjoy within 24 to 48 hours in a city. Each episode starts with the host landing at the city, with the clock starting the countdown until the time that he will leave the city. As a seasoned traveler, he meets up with locals and explores the city in and out, within matters of hours, both the touristy way and the local way.

On February 15, 2012, Travel Channel renewed the show for the 2012/2013 season, selecting November 19, 2012 for the second-season premiere; featured cities for the season include Atlanta, Chicago, Dublin, New Orleans, Paris, Philadelphia, São Paulo, Seattle, Toronto, and Taipei.

Episodes

Season 1 (2011–12)

Season 2 (2012–13)

References

External links 

 Article on the Huffingtonpost

English-language television shows
Food travelogue television series
Travel Channel original programming
2011 American television series debuts
2013 American television series endings